Sarah Luisa Fahr (born 12 September 2001) is a volleyball player who plays as a middle-blocker for Imoco Volley Conegliano. Born in Germany, she represents Italy internationally.

Personal life 
She was born in Bavaria from German parents but she is raised in Piombino (Tuscany).

Career 
She participated at the 2017 FIVB Volleyball Girl's U18 World Championship,  2018 FIVB Volleyball Women's Nations League, 2018 FIVB Volleyball Women's World Championship, and 2019 Women's European Volleyball Championship.

Awards

Clubs
 2020 Italian Supercup -  Champions, with Imoco Volley Conegliano
 2020-21 Italian Cup (Coppa Italia) -  Champion, with Imoco Volley Conegliano
 2020–21 Italian League -  Champion, with Imoco Volley Conegliano
 2020–21 CEV Women's Champions League -  Champion, with Imoco Volley Conegliano
 2021 Italian Supercup -  Champions, with Imoco Volley Conegliano
 2021-22 Italian Cup (Coppa Italia) -  Champion, with Imoco Volley Conegliano
 2021–22 Italian League -  Champion, with Imoco Volley Conegliano

Individual
 2019 Montreux Volley Masters "Best Middle Blocker"

References

External links 
  FIVB profile
 CEV profile

2001 births
Living people
Italian women's volleyball players
Italian people of German descent
People from Kulmbach
Sportspeople from Upper Franconia
Volleyball players at the 2020 Summer Olympics
Olympic volleyball players of Italy
21st-century Italian women